Superprofit, surplus profit or extra surplus-value is a concept in Karl Marx's critique of political economy subsequently elaborated by Vladimir Lenin and other Marxist thinkers.

Origin of the concept in Karl Marx's Capital 
The term superprofit (extra surplus-value) was first used by Marx in Das Kapital. It refers to above-average enterprise profits, arising in three main situations:
 Technologically advanced firms operating at above average productivity in a competitive growing market.
 Under conditions of declining demand, only firms with above-average productivity would obtain the previous socially average profit rate as the rest would book lower profits.
 Monopolies of resources or technologies, yielding what are effectively land rents, mining rents, or technological rents.

Although Marx does not discuss this in detail (beyond referring to international productivity differentials in the world economy), there could be included a fourth case, namely superprofits arising from structural unequal exchange in the world economy. In this case, superprofit arises simply through buying products cheaply in one place and selling them at a much higher price elsewhere, yielding an above-average profit margin. This type of superprofit may not be attributable to extra productivity or monopoly conditions and represent only a transfer of value from one place to another.

Lenin's interpretation 
According to Leninism, superprofits are extracted from the workers in colonial (or Third World) countries by the imperialist powers (in the First World). Part of these superprofits are then distributed (in the form of increased living standards) to the workers in the imperialists' home countries in order to buy their loyalty, achieve political stability and avoid a workers' revolution, usually by means of reformist labor parties. The workers who receive a large enough share of the superprofits have an interest to defend the capitalist system, so they become a labor aristocracy.

Superprofit in Marxist–Leninist theory is the result of unusually severe exploitation or superexploitation. All capitalist profit in Marxist–Leninist theory is based on exploitation (the business owners extract surplus value from the workers), but superprofit is achieved by taking exploitation above and beyond its normal level. In Marxism–Leninism, there are no profits that could result from an activity or transaction that did not involve exploitation, except socialist profits in a Soviet-type economy.

Ernest Mandel's theory 
Ernest Mandel argues in his book Late Capitalism that the frontline of capitalist development is always ruled by the search for surplus-profits (above-average returns).

Mandel argues that the growth pattern of modern capitalism is shaped by the quest for surplus-profits in monopolistic and oligopolistic markets in which a few large corporations dominate supply. Thus, the extra or above-average profits do not arise so much from real productivity gains, but from corporations monopolising access to resources, technologies and markets. It is not so much that enterprises with superior productivity outsell competitors, but that competitors are blocked in various ways from competing, for example through cartelisation, mergers, fusions, take-overs, government-sanctioned licensing, exclusive production and selling rights. In that case, the extra profits have less to do with reward for entrepreneurship than with market position and market power, i.e. the ability to offload business costs onto someone else (the state, consumers and other businesses) and force consumers to pay extra for access to the goods and services they buy, based on supply monopolies.

Tibor Palánkai instead argues that while superprofit can be monopolistic profit, abusing monopoly position is regulated by rigorous competition policies in developed democratic countries. Superprofit coming from other sources like comparative advantages or technical innovation contribute to public welfare.

Criticism 
Critics of superprofit hold a different view. Their argument can be summarised in the following points:
 The average rate of surplus value is typically higher in rich countries because of higher labor-productivity.
 High-paid skilled workers can be very militant and display class consciousness.
 The existence of reformist labor parties in the Third World.
 The differences in wages between rich and poor countries are far greater than the differences in wages within rich countries—so if anything, the whole working class in rich countries is a labor aristocracy from a global point of view.
 It is not clear that workers in the imperialist country directly share in repatriated profits from overseas dominions.
 The actual amount of repatriated profit from overseas investments that could trickle down to the working class as salary income is not large enough to sustain a labor aristocracy, if there is one.
 Probably the main economic benefit that workers in rich countries obtain directly from poor countries is cheap consumer goods, but in fact the monetary value of these goods is statistically only a small part of their total budget. The big ticket foreign-made items in working class budgets are foreign computer hardware, foreign-made appliances and foreign cars (i.e. durable consumer goods), but out of that total expenditure only a small fraction represents goods from poor countries.

See also 
 New Imperialism
 Neo-colonialism
 Profit (economics)
 Overexploitation
 Surplus value
 Unequal exchange

References

External links 
 Karl Marx. Das Kapital. Volume 3, Chapter XIV, Section V. 
 Vladimir Lenin. [http://www.marxists.org/archive/lenin/works/1916/oct/x01.htm Lenin, Imperialism and the Split in Socialism].
 Ernest Mandel. Late Capitalism.
 Makoto Itoh. Value and Crisis.
 Victor Perlo. The Empire of High Finance.
 Victor Perlo. Militarism and Industry.
 Michael Barratt-Brown. After Imperialism.
 Michael Barrat-Brown. The Economics of Imperialism.
 Robert Biel. The New Imperialism: Crisis and Contradictions in North/South Relations.

Marxian economics
Imperialism studies